Events in the year 2022 in Argentina.

Incumbents 
 President: Alberto Fernández
 Vice President: Cristina Fernández de Kirchner

Governors 
 Governor of Buenos Aires Province: Axel Kicillof
 Governor of Catamarca Province: Raúl Jalil
 Governor of Chaco Province: Jorge Capitanich
 Governor of Chubut Province: Mariano Arcioni
 Governor of Córdoba: Juan Schiaretti
 Governor of Corrientes Province: Gustavo Valdés
 Governor of Entre Ríos Province: Gustavo Bordet
 Governor of Formosa Province: Gildo Insfrán
 Governor of Jujuy Province: Gerardo Morales
 Governor of La Pampa Province: Sergio Ziliotto
 Governor of La Rioja Province: Ricardo Quintela
 Governor of Mendoza Province: Rodolfo Suárez
 Governor of Misiones Province: Oscar Herrera Ahuad
 Governor of Neuquén Province: Omar Gutiérrez
 Governor of Río Negro Province: Arabela Carreras
 Governor of Salta Province: Gustavo Sáenz
 Governor of San Juan Province: Sergio Uñac
 Governor of San Luis Province: Alberto Rodríguez Saá
 Governor of Santa Cruz Province: Alicia Kirchner
 Governor of Santa Fe Province: Omar Perotti
 Governor of Santiago del Estero: Gerardo Zamora
 Governor of Tierra del Fuego: Gustavo Melella
 Governor of Tucumán: Osvaldo jaldo

Vice Governors 
 Vice Governor of Buenos Aires Province: Verónica Magario
 Vice Governor of Catamarca Province: Rubén Dusso
 Vice Governor of Chaco Province: Analía Rach Quiroga
 Vice Governor of Corrientes Province: Gustavo Canteros
 Vice Governor of Entre Rios Province: María Laura Stratta
 Vice Governor of Formosa Province: Eber Wilson Solís
 Vice Governor of Jujuy Province: Carlos Haquim
 Vice Governor of La Pampa Province: Mariano Fernández
 Vice Governor of La Rioja Province: Florencia López
 Vice Governor of Mendoza Province: Mario Abed
 Vice Governor of Misiones Province: Carlos Omar Arce
 Vice Governor of Neuquén Province: Marcos Koopmann
 Vice Governor of Rio Negro Province: Alejandro Palmieri
 Vice Governor of Salta Province: Antonio Marocco
 Vice Governor of San Juan Province: Roberto Gattoni
 Vice Governor of San Luis Province: Eduardo Mones Ruiz
 Vice Governor of Santa Cruz: Eugenio Quiroga
 Vice Governor of Santa Fe Province: Alejandra Rodenas
 Vice Governor of Santiago del Estero: Carlos Silva Neder
 Vice Governor of Tierra del Fuego: Mónica Urquiza

Ongoing events 
 COVID-19 pandemic in Argentina

Events 
 21 January – Argentina formally requests Russia to arrest Iranian minister Mohsen Rezai, who is on a trip to Russia, based on the accusation by Argentina of Rezai's involvement in the 1994 AMIA bombing. Russia did not immediately respond.
 20 August – 2022 Tucumán legionellosis outbreak
 1 September – Attempted assassination of Cristina Fernández de Kirchner
 18 December – Argentina wins the FIFA World Cup in Qatar

Deaths 

 13 January – Mario Cámpora, diplomat (b. 1930).
 15 January – Aurora del Mar, actress (b. 1934).
 20 January – Eduardo Flores, association football player (b. 1944).

References

 
Argentina
Argentina
2020s in Argentina
Years of the 21st century in Argentina